The Richmond & Westmoreland Streets Loop is a turning loop located in the Port Richmond section of Philadelphia, Pennsylvania. The transit loop was built on part of the former PTC's Richmond Carhouse/Depot and is operated by the Southeastern Pennsylvania Transportation Authority (SEPTA), which is located between Allegheny Avenue and Westmoreland Street. The transit loop serves as a terminus for several transit routes.

The transit routes that serve this terminus run to various parts of the City of Philadelphia.

The transit lines that run from this loop are SEPTA Route 15, SEPTA Route 60 and SEPTA Route 73. These lines operate from three SEPTA Depots located around Philadelphia.

External links

SEPTA Route 15
SEPTA Route 60
SEPTA Route 73

Public transportation in Pennsylvania
SEPTA stations and terminals
SEPTA Route 15 stations